Ousmane Fané (born 13 December 1993) is a French professional footballer who plays for Malaysia Super League club Penang as a midfielder.

Career
Born in Paris, Fané spent his early career in France and Norway with Bayonne, Paris, Racing Paris, GSI Pontivy and FK Lyn. After playing with English club Kidderminster Harriers, he signed a two-year contract with Oldham Athletic in August 2016. At the end of the 2017–18 season, when Oldham were relegated to League Two, the club exercised an option to extend Fané's contract. In July 2018 he broke his leg and dislocated his ankle. He was released by Oldham at the end of the 2018–19 season. On 3 December 2019, Fané signed for League One club Shrewsbury Town on a deal until the end of the season, with an option of a further year. He left the club on 2 January 2020 for personal reasons and moved back to his native France in order to be nearer to his family. In February 2020 he signed for Malaysian club UiTM. In March 2021 he signed for Indonesian club Persiraja Banda Aceh. He returned to UiTM in April 2021. On 18 January 2022, Fané returned to England to join Morecambe, linking back up with former manager Stephen Robinson, who had brought him to Oldham. He left Morecambe by mutual consent on 2 January 2023. On 4 January 2023, Fané returned to Malaysia and signed for Penang.

Personal life
In July 2020 Fané missed the birth of his first child in Paris due to travel restrictions as a result of the COVID-19 pandemic.

Career statistics

References

1993 births
Living people
Association football midfielders
French footballers
Aviron Bayonnais FC players
Paris FC players
Racing Club de France Football players
GSI Pontivy players
Lyn Fotball players
Kidderminster Harriers F.C. players
Oldham Athletic A.F.C. players
Shrewsbury Town F.C. players
UiTM FC players
Persiraja Banda Aceh players
Morecambe F.C. players
Championnat National 3 players
Championnat National 2 players
Norwegian Second Division players
National League (English football) players
English Football League players
Malaysia Super League players
French expatriate footballers
French expatriate sportspeople in Norway
Expatriate footballers in Norway
French expatriate sportspeople in England
Expatriate footballers in England
French expatriate sportspeople in Malaysia
Expatriate footballers in Malaysia
French expatriate sportspeople in Indonesia
Expatriate footballers in Indonesia
Penang F.C. players